The Netherlands Film Academy (NFA) was founded in 1958.

The academy is the only recognised institute in the Netherlands that offers training to prepare for the work in the various crew disciplines.  Specialisation is possible in fiction directing, documentary directing, screenwriting, editing, producing, sounddesign, cinematography, production design, and interactive multimedia/visual effects.

The Netherlands Film Academy is situated at Markenplein 1. It is a division of the Amsterdam University of the Arts.

Alumni
Jan de Bont, cinematographer of Die Hard and director of Twister and Speed
Stephan Brenninkmeijer, director and film producer
Pieter Jan Brugge, producer of Heat and Defiance
Danniel Danniel, director and editor of Ei 1987.
Mike van Diem, director of Character
Gied Jaspars, television and radio director
Martin Koolhoven, director
Nanouk Leopold, director
Dick Maas, director
Pim de la Parra, director
Diederik van Rooijen, director
Theo van de Sande, cinematographer of Blade and Grown Ups
Carel Struycken, actor in The Addams Family and Twin Peaks
Paul Verhoeven, director of Total Recall and Basic Instinct
Leon de Winter, writer and film producer

References

External links

Official website

Amsterdam University of the Arts
Film organisations in the Netherlands
Film schools in the Netherlands